In Greek mythology, Olganos was a river and river-god, son of Beres in ancient Macedonia.

Family 

Olganos was the first son of Beres and the brother of Mieza and Beroia after whom the Macedonian cities of Mieza (now Naousa) and Beroia (now Veria) were named.

Archaeology 

An inscribed bust of Olganos (circa. 2nd century) was found at Kopanos / Emathia and is now on display at the Archaeological Museum in Veria, Greece.

References

 Mogens Herman Hansen An inventory of archaic and classical poleis Thomas Heine Nielsen

External links
Akalanthis.gr - Inscribed bust
Epigraphical Database Makedonia (Bottiaia) — Mieza: Kopanos — ca. 150-180 AD

Potamoi
Religion in ancient Macedonia
Bottiaea